The crash of Northwest Orient Airlines Flight 1–11 was an accident involving a Douglas DC-7C of the American airline Northwest Orient 8 km (5 miles) Northeast off Polillo Island, Philippines , on July 14, 1960. Of the 58 people on board, 57 survived with 44 suffering from minor injuries and one female passenger losing her life.

Accident
In the evening of July 13, 1960, at 11.25 pm, Flight 1–11 landed at Okinawa-Naha Airport on the Japanese island of Okinawa which was its last intented stopover of its journey from New York City, United States to Manila, Philippines. The other stopovers included the American cities of Seattle, Washington and Anchorage, Alaska, as well as Japan's capital Tokyo.

The aircraft readied itself for the last leg of its journey to Manila and took of from Okinawa-Naha Airport at 1.12 am on July 14. Around two hours after takeoff at 3.15 am, engine no. 2 underwenth a sudden loss of power which was indicated to the plane's crew by a drop in mean effective pressure and manifold pressure. The crew believed that the origin of the problem lay with Carburetor icing and so took action to correct the issue. When no improvement was made to the situation of engine no. 2, the captain noticed the oil-out temperature of the engine rising. The crew thereafter attempted to feather the propeller of engine no. 2, but failed numerous times. Following the ongoing engine troubles, the flight was cleard to descend from FL180  to FL100 . In an effort to halt engine no. 2 rotation, the crew attempted to activate the firewall shutoff valve so the engine would be deprived of lubricant. As a result, the propeller separated from engine no. 2 and slashed a 15-inch (38.1 cm) hole in the plane's fuselage. More damage was reported by a continuous fire alarm, alerting the crew of a fire in engine no. 2 which had also spread to the wing. The crew had no choice but to ditch the aircraft in the Pacific Ocean about 124.7 km (77.5 miles) Northeast of Manila and 8 km (5 miles) Northeast off Polillo Island, Philippines. Upon hitting the water at 4.30 am, the tail of the aircraft sheared off alongside the right wing and all engines.

The right wing remained afloat for three hours following the crash, working as a makeshift liferaft for many survivors. While the remainder of the aircraft sank between 8 and 10 minutes after the ditching. The survivors were ultimately rescued by the US Coast Guard and US Navy some four to six hours after the crash. Of the 58 passengers and crew, 57 survived with 44 suffering minor injuries. A single passenger died when the engine no. 2 propeller slashed through the plane's fuselage and struck her.

Aircraft
The Douglas DC-7C involved, N292 (msn 45462/925) was built in 1958 and was used by Northwest Orient Airlines from 1958 until its destruction in 1960.

Aftermath
The aircraft was torn apart by the impact with the wreckage sinking to the bottom of the Pacific. An investigation of the accident concluded that an internal failure of the no. 2 engine had caused the plane's oil supply to be contaminated, resulting in a loss of oil supply and therefor the subsequent damage to the engine which ended with the propeller detaching after its assembly was disturbed, and engine fire that spread to the plane's wing, making a ditching of the aircraft necessary.

References

Northwest Airlines accidents and incidents
Airliner accidents and incidents caused by engine failure
Airliner accidents and incidents caused by in-flight fires
Airliner accidents and incidents involving ditching
Airliner accidents and incidents involving uncontained engine failure
July 1960 events in Asia
1960 in the Philippines
Aviation accidents and incidents in 1960
Accidents and incidents involving the Douglas DC-7
Aviation accidents and incidents in the Pacific Ocean
1960 disasters in Oceania
1960 disasters in the Philippines